Carystus or Karystos was a town in ancient Laconia, in the district Aegytis, near the frontiers of Laconia. Its wine was celebrated by the poet Alcman. William Martin Leake, a 19th-century explorer and classicist, supposed that Carystus stood at the site known as "Huts of Giorgitzes" (Καλύβια Γιωργίτζη), but modern scholars treat its site as unlocated.

References

Populated places in ancient Laconia
Former populated places in Greece
Lost ancient cities and towns